The women's  100 metre freestyle event at the 1978 World Aquatics Championships took place 28 August.

Results

Heats

Final

References

USASwimming

Swimming at the 1978 World Aquatics Championships